Coach Trip is a British reality game show originally broadcast on Channel 4 from 7 March 2005 to 30 June 2006. The programme returned after a three-year break, from 25 May 2009 to 9 March 2012. In early 2013, the show went into hiatus again and was replaced by 2 new shows, Brendan's Magical Mystery Tour and Brendan's Love Cruise. However, in September 2013, Channel 4 announced that they had renewed Coach Trip for another series in 2014 which has now aired. On 9 April 2014, a further four series were announced following the success of the ninth series in early 2014.

The first series of the relaunched Coach Trip: Road to... aired on E4 from 25 July 2016 to 2 September 2016 entitled Coach Trip: Road to Ibiza, the second series aired from 16 January 2017 to 24 February 2017 with the title Coach Trip: Road to Marbs. The third series aired from 24 July 2017 to 15 September 2017 with the title Coach Trip: Road to Zante. The series was renewed for a fourth series in July 2017. This was titled Coach Trip: Road to Tenerife and aired from 8 January 2018 to 2 March 2018. The fifth series  began airing on 28 January 2019 with the title Coach Trip: Road to Barcelona, reverting to 30 episodes, it ended on 8 March 2019.

Broadcast, narrators and repeats 

Coach Trip originally aired weekdays at 4:30pm before Deal or No Deal debuted on Channel 4 (followed by a repeat the following morning), with the second series aired at 2:55pm instead (and then repeated between July and August 2007). Since the revived series, Coach Trip has moved to the 5:00pm slot (in series 3, 4, 7, 9, Celebrity Coach Trip 2 & 3 and Christmas Coach Trip) and later to the 5:30pm slot (in series 5, 6, 8, 9, 10, 11, 12, 13 and Celebrity Coach Trip 1) on Channel 4. Since the 14th series (Coach Trip: Road to Ibiza) in 2016, the show has aired on weekdays at 7:30pm on E4.

In series 3, an omnibus edition was also shown on weekends but was cancelled part of the way through the series. It returned for series 9 on More4.

Andy Love was the narrator in the first two series, with David Quantick taking the role in both series 3 and 4. From series 5 to 8, Dave Vitty was the show's narrator; he was also the narrator for all the Celebrity and Christmas series' of Coach Trip to date. Jackie Clune was the narrator from series 9 to 13, with Clara Amfo taking over for the 14th series.

4seven aired repeats of series 8 onwards, More4 repeated all series, and defunct Sky Travel, Pick (then known as Sky Three/Sky3/Pick TV) and defunct Sky Real Lives have all only repeated series 1 & 2 of Coach Trip along with defunct Channel 4 scheduling slot, T4 on weekend mornings. Celebrity Coach Trip began showing repeats on Travel Channel in May 2014.

Hiatus 
A Channel 4 spokesperson said the broadcaster previously had no plans to commission another series. Brendan later said in June 2013, during a telephone interview to Paul about his 2 new shows, that "Coach Trip has been rested at the moment – it's not the end of the programme, but we decided that we’d experiment with two new formats".

Revival 
On 4 September 2013, Channel 4 announced there would be another series of Coach Trip consisting of 30 episodes, each 30 minutes long. Sheerin and Donald both returned to the show. Applications for the new series opened on the same day. On 9 April 2014, it was confirmed by Digital Spy that the show would return for a further four series (80 episodes in total).

On 6 April 2016, it was announced that Coach Trip will return for a fourteenth series in 2016 on E4. This series is called Coach Trip: Road to Ibiza and it began airing on 25 July 2016.

On 23 August 2016, Channel 4 confirmed that Coach Trip would return for series 15 & 16 in 2017. On 13 July 2017 it was announced that Coach Trip would return for series 17.

Format & Continents 
The show's format consists of four to seven teams of two undertaking a coach tour principally of continental Europe (but with individual series including sojourns into North Africa and Western Asia) and has been sold to other countries. The tours have usually lasted between 20 and 50 days (Celebrity series tours have lasted between 10 and 15 days and Christmas series tours have also lasted 15 days), with passengers remaining on the tour only until they are ejected by their companions via popular vote, to be replaced by a new couple the following day. The travellers are accompanied by tour guide Brendan Sheerin, who appears in every episode.

Coaches, registration plates and drivers 
The coaches used were originally supplied by Motts Travel, a coach hire company based in Aylesbury, Buckinghamshire, up to Series 13. From Series 14 entitled "The Road to Ibiza", the coach has been supplied by Westway Coaches, based in Raynes Park, London. The coaches are installed with cameras and microphones to record the passengers while on board. The coaches used in the show are decorated with a Union Flag design on the outside, Series 14 entitled "The Road to Ibiza" introduced a new beach design with #COACHTRIP on the coach roof.

The first coach 'T100 MTT' was a Volvo B10M with Jonckheere Mistral 50 bodywork. It was used during Series 1 and Series 2.
The coach 'MT04 MTT' arrived in Central London to be used for Series 3 only. It is a Volvo B12B with Plaxton Panther bodywork.
The coach 'MT09 MTT', also a Volvo B12B/Plaxton Panther, was used between Series 4 and 13.
The coach '29 WT', a personalised Van Hool TX series tri-axle, is used from Series 14 entitled "The Road to Ibiza" also use for other Road to ? series.

There have been four different drivers who drove each coach on each different series. In the 1st series, the driver was Chris Groombridge who only drove T100 MTT. Series 2 saw his successor, Paul Donald take over as coach driver until the 10th series. On Day 13 in Series 8, a temporary driver (Jamie) took over for the day and drove the coach to the ferry port. Series 11 saw Malcom Kimber take over as coach driver, Series 14 entitled "The Road to Ibiza" introduced George & Charles as new drivers.

Series overview

Regular

Series 1 (2005)

Coach Trip 1 was the first series of Coach Trip in the United Kingdom. Filming started in April 2004 and lasted until June 2004, the series began airing on 7 March 2005 and concluded on 19 April 2005. The trip went through several European countries. Chris Groombridge was the driver for the only time, Brendan Sheerin was the tour guide, Andy Love was narrator and the registration was T100 MTT.

Series 2 (2006)

Coach Trip 2 was the second series of Coach Trip in the United Kingdom. Filming started in May 2005 and lasted until July 2005, the series began airing on 22 May 2006 and concluded on 30 June 2006. The show's format had the same idents as series 1. This year the trip was centred on Mediterranean countries. Brendan returned as the tour guide, the narrator was once again Andy Love and the registration number plate once again was T100 MTT. Paul Donald was the driver for the first time.

Series 3 (2009)

Coach Trip 3 was the third series of Coach Trip in the United Kingdom. Filming started in September 2008 and lasted until October 2008, the series began airing on 25 May 2009 and concluded on 3 July 2009. The show's format after a break of 3 years remained unchanged from the previous series but the titles were new along with the timeslot: seven couples travelling around Europe on a coach like series 1 for 30 days attempting vote off the least popular couples. With visits to Croatia, the Czech Republic, Hungary, Liechtenstein and Luxembourg for the first time. Tour guide Brendan Sheerin and coach driver Paul Donald both returned for this series, which aired on Channel 4 with a similar start to series 1 and a similar end to series 2. David Quantick was the narrator and MT04 MTT was the registration number plate for the first and only time.

Series 4 (2010)

Coach Trip 4 was the fourth series of Coach Trip in the United Kingdom. Filming started on 7 September 2009 and lasted until 27 October 2009, the series began airing on 15 February 2010 and concluded on 23 April 2010. The length of this series was longer than the previous instalments, increased from 30 days to 50 days for a tour centred on European, Mediterranean, North African and West Asian countries on a coach like series 1, 2 and 3 attempting to vote off the least popular couples. Tour guide Brendan Sheerin, coach driver Paul Donald and narrator David Quantick all returned for this series, which aired on Channel 4. MT09 MTT was the coach registration number plate.

Series 5 (2010)

Coach Trip 5 was the fifth series of Coach Trip in the United Kingdom. Filming started in May 2010 and lasted until June 2010, the series began airing on 30 August 2010 and concluded on 8 October 2010. The show's format changed slightly from previous series and with weekends included, from Day 2 of that the couple who received a yellow card the previous day would be immune from the following vote the next day. The series involves seven couples traveling on a one-month tour centering on Northern European countries for the first time, with visits to Denmark, Finland, Sweden, Norway, Lithuania, Latvia and Estonia. Tour guide Brendan Sheerin, coach driver Paul Donald and the MT09 MTT registration all returned for this series, which airs on Channel 4. Dave Vitty was the narrator for the first time and the airing time moved from 5:00pm to 5:30pm.

Series 6 (2011)

Coach Trip 6 was the sixth series of Coach Trip in the United Kingdom. Filming started in July 2010 and lasted until August 2010, the series began airing on 14 February 2011 and concluded on 25 March 2011. The voting system rules reverted to those of earlier series. The length of this series was the same as the previous non-celebrity series but with weekends excluded. The tour visited Mediterranean countries like series 2 but with visits to Switzerland added for a month. Tour guide Brendan Sheerin, coach driver Paul Donald, narrator Dave Vitty and the coach with registration number MT09 MTT all returned for this series, which was aired on Channel 4 with a similar start to series 2 and a similar end to series 4.

Series 7 (2011)

Coach Trip 7 was the seventh series of Coach Trip in the United Kingdom. Filming started in May 2011 and lasted until June 2011, the series began airing on 29 August 2011 and concluded on 7 October 2011. The length of this series was the same as the previous non-celebrity series but still with weekends excluded. The European tour began in the UK, before moving to France, Germany, Switzerland, Liechtenstein, Austria, Hungary, the Czech Republic plus for the first time ever Poland and Slovakia. Tour guide Brendan Sheerin, coach driver Paul Donald, narrator Dave Vitty and the coach with registration number MT09 MTT all returned for this series, which was aired on Channel 4 with the airing time reverted to 5:00pm, with a similar start to series 1 and a similar end to series 3.

Christmas Coach Trip (2011)

Christmas Coach Trip was a Christmas-themed version of Coach Trip. It began airing on the same day that filming finished. The trip started from Trondheim Airport, Værnes, followed by Trondheim, Norway and the final destination was Inari, Finland. The tourists arrived back in Great Britain via Kirkenes Airport, Høybuktmoen and the filming took place from 28 November to 12 December 2011.

Series 8 (2012)

Coach Trip 8 was the eighth and final series of Coach Trip in the United Kingdom, before the 2012 Summer Olympics and Paralympics. Filming started on 29 August 2011 and lasted until 1 October 2011, the series began airing on 30 January 2012, after the third celebrity series concluded, concluding on 9 March 2012. The length of this series was the same as the previous non-celebrity series but with only 1 day of a weekend included at the end of the tour. The Mediterranean tour centring towards Western Asia began in the UK, before moving to Germany, Austria, Italy, the Netherlands, Greece, Bulgaria, Turkey, and for the first time Macedonia. Tour guide Brendan Sheerin, coach driver Paul Donald, narrator Dave Vitty and the coach with registration number MT09 MTT all returned for the series with a similar start to series 3 and a similar end to series 4, which was aired weekdays on Channel 4 and the airing time again moved to 5:30pm.

Series 9 (2014)

Coach Trip 9 was the ninth series of Coach Trip in the United Kingdom, following the broadcaster's decision to renew the show. Filming started in September 2013 and lasted until October 2013, the series began airing on 27 January 2014 and concluded on 8 March 2014. The ninth series saw Brendan Sheerin return as tour guide, as in all previous editions and Paul Donald continue as coach driver and MT09 MTT was the registration of the coach once again. The tour had a similar start to series 1 & 3 and includes visits to Sardinia for the first time. The series aired on weekdays at 5:30pm from episodes 1 to 15, however was moved to 5:00pm from episodes 16 to 29 due to Superstar Dogs: Countdown to Crufts. Due to the 2014 Winter Paralympics opening ceremony on Channel 4, episode 30 was instead aired on More4 at 12:10pm on 8 March 2014.

Series 10 (2014)

Coach Trip 10 was the tenth series of Coach Trip in the United Kingdom. Filming took place between July and August 2014. The series began airing on 27 October 2014 for 20 episodes, concluding on 21 November 2014.

Series 11 (2014)

Coach Trip 11 was the eleventh series of Coach Trip in the United Kingdom. Filming took place between September and October 2014, The series began airing on 24 November 2014 for 20 episodes, 3 days after the tenth series concluded, concluding on 19 December 2014.

Series 12 (2015)

Coach Trip 12 was the twelfth series of Coach Trip in the United Kingdom. Filming took place in November 2014, The series began airing on 2 March 2015 for 20 episodes, concluding on 27 March 2015.

Series 13 (2015)

Coach Trip 13 was the thirteenth and final series of Coach Trip. Filming took place between November and December 2014, The series began airing on 30 March 2015 for 20 episodes, 3 days after the twelfth series concluded, concluding on 24 April 2015. These were the last 20 episodes of the original 80 that were commissioned in April 2014.

Series 14: "Road to Ibiza" (2016)

Coach Trip returned for its fourteenth series, consisting of 30 episodes, on 25 July 2016 moving from Channel 4 to E4,  Filming took place between May and July 2015 and the series is known as Coach Trip: Road to Ibiza. On the last day of the coach trip the five remaining couples voted for the couple that they want to win the luxury holiday in Ibiza and the £1,000 prize.

The Voting system on this series was:
  Days 1 to 26 was a yellow card
  Days 27 to 29 an automatic red card due to all couples canvassing for future votes before the vote on day 24

Similar system to Celebrity Coach Trip.

Series 15: "Road to Marbs" (2017)

Coach Trip series 15 was confirmed by Channel 4 on 23 August 2016. Filming of series 15 took place between October and November 2016 (before Deal or No Deal on Channel 4 ended). It began airing on 16 January 2017, consisting of 30 episodes, this time round with title Coach Trip: Road to Marbs. On the last day of the coach trip the five remaining couples voted for the couple that they want to win the luxury holiday in Marbella and the £1,000 prize.

On Day 21, partners, Bradley & Kevin, got engaged during the flying activity. This is the first time a couple has engaged on Coach Trip. The pair went on to win the series.

Series 16: "Road to Zante" (2017)

Coach Trip series 16 was confirmed by E4 on 14 December 2016. Filming took place between 14 May 2017 and 12 June. This is a new format, as it consisted of 40 episodes and followed the "Road to..." format. The sixteenth series has the title Coach Trip: Road to Zante.

Series 17: "Road to Tenerife" (2018)

It was confirmed on 13 July 2017 that Coach Trip was renewed for series 17. Filming took place between 1 September 2017 and 22 October 2017. The series consisted of 40 episodes and followed the "Road to..." format. The seventeenth series has the title Coach Trip: Road to Tenerife and aired from 8 January 2018 to 2 March 2018.

Series 18: "Road to Barcelona" (2019)

Series 18 of Coach Trip has been confirmed by Channel 4. It again follows the Road to... format. The filming took place between 6 May and 8 July 2018. The series reverted to 30 episodes from 28 January 2019 to 8 March 2019 and has the title Coach Trip: Road to Barcelona.

The Voting system on this series was the same as Road to Ibiza:
  Days 1 to 26 was a yellow card
  Days 27 to 29 an automatic red card due to all couples canvassing for future votes before the vote on day 25

Similar system to Celebrity Coach Trip.

Celebrity

Series 1 (2010)

Celebrity Coach Trip 1 is the first series of Celebrity Coach Trip which was filmed from 6 to 20 September 2010 and began airing on 8 November 2010. The series featured a variety of celebrity couples on a 10-day tour, the couples get to vote off the other couples that they do not get along with. On the last day of the coach trip the remaining couples vote for the couple that they want to win the £1,000 prize for charity. The first day of the coach trip started in Prague and the last day of the trip ended in Venice. Tour guide Brendan Sheerin, narrator Dave Vitty, coach driver Paul Donald and the MT09 MTT registration all returned for this series, which aired on Channel 4.

The Voting system on this series was:
  Days 1 to 4 was a yellow card
  Days 5 to 9 an automatic red card

Series 2 (2011)

Celebrity Coach Trip 2 was the second celebrity series of Coach Trip which aired from 10–21 October 2011. The series featured a variety of celebrity couples on a 10-day tour, the couples get to vote off the other couples that they do not get along with. Filming took place from 9 to 23 April 2011. On the last day of the coach trip the remaining couples vote for the couple that they want to win the £1,000 prize for charity. This coach trip had a journey around the Mediterranean, with the starting location and pick up point in South Paris, France, and the first destination was Monaco.

The Voting system on this series was:
  Days 1 to 5 was a yellow card
  Days 6 to 9 an automatic red card

Series 3 (2012)

Celebrity Coach Trip 3 was the third (and, at the time, the final) celebrity series of Coach Trip which aired from 16 to 27 January 2012 before series 8 started airing. Filming took place from 4 to 18 July 2011.
On the last day of the coach trip the remaining couples vote for the couple that they want to win the £1,000 prize for charity. This coach trip had another journey around the Mediterranean, with the starting location and pick up point in Trieste, Italy, and the first destination was Ljubljana, Slovenia.

The Voting system on this series was:
  Days 1 to 6 was a yellow card
  Days 7 to 9 an automatic red card

Series 4: "Road to Benidorm" (2019)

In 2018, it was announced that Celebrity Coach Trip would return for a fourth series after a seven-year hiatus. Celebrity Coach Trip 4 has the title Celebrity Coach Trip: Road to Benidorm and will air from 14 to 25 January 2019.

The Voting system on this series was:
  Days 1 to 6 was a yellow card
  Days 7 to 9 an automatic red card

Series 5 (2019)

In 2019, it was announced that Celebrity Coach Trip would return for a fifth series. Celebrity Coach Trip 5 began airing on 7 October 2019. and was won by Francis Boulle and Sarah Keyworth.

The Voting system on this series was:
  Days 1 to 4 was a yellow card
  Days 5 to 9 an automatic red card

Series 6 (2020)

Celebrity Coach Trip 6 began broadcasting on 6 January 2020. This series ran for 15 days instead of the usual 10 and was won by Adele Roberts and Kate Holderness.

The Voting system on this series was:
  Days 1 to 13 was a yellow card
  Day 14 was an automatic red card

Celebrity Ghost Trip (2021)

Celebrity Ghost Trip began airing on 24 October 2021. It was announced that the series would return after a two year hiatus due to the COVID-19 pandemic. This series was titled Celebrity Ghost Trip as instead of the usual trip around Europe, they instead toured spooky locations around the United Kingdom. Filming began in September 2021 and the show will return in the Autumn.

Series 7 (2022)

Celebrity Coach Trip 7 began broadcasting on 3 January 2022.

List of activities 
On each series of Coach Trip there are different activities each day for the tourists and celebrities to do and/or have already done by order of appearance. Below is a (near complete) list of activities that have featured on Coach Trip to date.

Records

List of countries visited

Europe 

Andorra
Austria
Kingdom of Belgium
Bulgaria
Corsica (Part of France (Second celebrity series only))
Croatia
Czech Republic
Denmark
Estonia (Fifth regular series only)
Republic of Finland
France
Germany
Gibraltar (British Overseas Territory of Spain (Second regular series only))
United Kingdom of Great Britain & Northern Ireland
Greece
Hungary
Ibiza (Part of Spain)
Italy
Latvia
Liechtenstein
Lithuania
Luxembourg
Republic of Macedonia
Malta (Fourth regular series only)
Monaco
Montenegro
Kingdom of the Netherlands
Kingdom of Norway
Poland
Portugal
Sardinia (Part of Italy (Ninth regular series only))
Sicily (Part of Italy (Fourth regular series only))
Serbia
Slovakia
Slovenia
Kingdom of Spain
Kingdom of Sweden
Switzerland
Turkey

North Africa 
Morocco
Tunisia (Fourth regular series only)

Western Asia 
Turkey

Transmissions

Regular series

Celebrity series

Other versions

Related shows 
On 24 June 2013, a replacement show called Brendan's Magical Mystery Tour began on Channel 4. The series was filmed from September 2012 (visiting Barcelona, Jamaica, Cancún in Mexico and  Istanbul) and aired in the 5:00pm slot, narrated by Tupele Dorgu.

On 13 September 2012, Sheerin announced in an interview that he had signed a deal to host a new dating show for Channel 4, titled 'Brendan's Love Boat'. The other replacement show (produced by Optomen) was aired in December 2013, after being commissioned for a 20-episode series. The series, renamed Brendan's Love Cruise, began on 2 December on More4 in the 9:20am slot, narrated by Maria McErlane.

References

External links 
 
 
 
 
 
 
 
 
 
 
 
 
 
 
 
 
 
 

 
2005 British television series debuts
2000s British reality television series
2000s British game shows
2010s British reality television series
2010s British game shows
2020s British reality television series
2020s British game shows
2000s British travel television series
2010s British travel television series
2020s British travel television series
English-language television shows
Television series by ITV Studios
British television series revived after cancellation